Cotton Row Historic District may refer to:

Cotton Row Historic District (Greenwood, Mississippi), listed on the National Register of Historic Places in Leflore County, Mississippi
Cotton Row Historic District (Memphis, Tennessee), listed on the National Register of Historic Places in Shelby County, Tennessee